Isakovo is a village in the municipality of Ćuprija, Serbia. According to the 2002 census, the village has a population of 646 people with an ethnic Timok Romanian ("Vlach") majority.

References

Populated places in Pomoravlje District
Romanian communities in Serbia